See Jack Run is a 1992 Australian television film about urban teenagers. Directed by Stephen Amis, it stars Trent Mooney.

Plot
In Melbourne's western suburbs, seventeen year old Brian Johnson has an inadequate education and a family involved in crime.

Cast
Trent Mooney as Brian Johnson
Molly Brumm as Jan Wilson
Ellisa Holloway as Karen Molloy

Release
The film screened at the 1994 Melbourne International Film Festival and was nationally screened in Australia on the Channel Nine network.

References

External links

See Jack Run at Screen Australia
See Jack Run at BFI
See Jack Run at Peter Malone
See Jack Run at Melbourne International Film Festival
Who Cares? the original play at Ausstage

Australian television films
1992 films
1990s English-language films